Unbridled is a novel written by Nigerian novelist Jude Dibia. It was first published in 2007.

References

Notes 

2007 Nigerian novels
Novels set in Nigeria